Nyalam County (Tibetan: gnya' lam rdzong) is a county in Tibet's Shigatse Prefecture. It borders on Nepal.

The population as of 2003 was 10,000. The postal code for the county is 858300.

The county seat is in Nyalam Town.

The other town of the county is Dram, also known under its Tibetan name Dram, or Nepali Khasa. It is located near the border and is the point of entry from Nepal. At "merely" 2300 meters elevation about the sea level, Zhangmu has mild and humid subtropical climate, which is a rarity for Tibet.

It is one of the four counties that comprise the Qomolangma National Nature Preserve (Nyalam, Tingri, Dinggyê, and Kyirong).

Towns and townships

 Nyalam Town
 Dram Town
 Yarlêb Township
 Zurco Township
 Nailung Township
 Mainpu Township
 Borong Township

Climate

Transport 
China National Highway 318

References

External links 
 Zhangmu town tourist information 
 Sara Shneiderman "Swapping Identities: Borderland exchanges along the Nepal-TAR frontier"

 
Counties of Tibet
Shigatse